This is a list of pine species by geographical distribution. For a taxonomy of the genus, see Pinus classification.

Old World

Europe and Mediterranean (some into Asia)
Pinus brutia - Turkish pine
Pinus canariensis - Canary Island pine
Pinus cembra - Swiss pine
Pinus halepensis - Aleppo pine
Pinus heldreichii - Bosnian pine
Pinus mugo - Mountain pine
Pinus nigra - European black pine, Austrian pine
Pinus peuce - Macedonian pine
Pinus pinaster - Maritime pine
Pinus pinea - Stone pine
Pinus sylvestris - Scots pine

Asia
Pinus amamiana - Yakushima white pine
Pinus armandii - Chinese white pine
Pinus bhutanica - Bhutan white pine
Pinus bungeana - Lacebark pine
Pinus dalatensis - Vietnamese white pine
Pinus densata - Sikang pine
Pinus densiflora - Korean red pine
Pinus fenzeliana - Hainan white pine
Pinus hwangshanensis - Huangshan pine
Pinus kesiya - Khasi pine
Pinus koraiensis - Korean pine
Pinus krempfii - Krempf's pine
Pinus latteri - Tenasserim pine
Pinus luchuensis - Luchu pine
Pinus massoniana - Masson's pine
Pinus merkusii - Sumatran pine
Pinus morrisonicola - Taiwan white pine
Pinus parviflora - Japanese white pine
Pinus pumila - Siberian dwarf pine
Pinus roxburghii - Chir pine
Pinus sibirica - Siberian pine
Pinus squamata - Qiaojia pine
Pinus tabuliformis - Chinese red pine
Pinus taiwanensis - Taiwan red pine
Pinus thunbergii - Japanese black pine
Pinus wallichiana - Blue pine or Bhutan pine
Pinus wangii (syn. P. kwangtungensis) - Guangdong white pine
Pinus yunnanensis - Yunnan pine

New World

Eastern Canada, Eastern United States
Pinus banksiana - Jack pine
Pinus clausa - Sand pine
Pinus echinata - Shortleaf pine
Pinus elliottii - Slash pine
Pinus glabra - Spruce pine
Pinus palustris - Longleaf pine
Pinus pungens - Table Mountain pine
Pinus resinosa - Red pine
Pinus rigida - Pitch pine
Pinus serotina - Pond pine
Pinus strobus - Eastern white pine
Pinus taeda - Loblolly pine
Pinus virginiana - Virginia pine

Western Canada, United States, and northern Mexico
Pinus albicaulis - Whitebark pine
Pinus aristata - Rocky Mountains bristlecone pine
Pinus attenuata - Knobcone pine
Pinus balfouriana - Foxtail pine
Pinus contorta - Lodgepole pine
Pinus coulteri - Coulter pine
Pinus edulis - Colorado pinyon
Pinus flexilis - Limber pine
Pinus jeffreyi - Jeffrey pine
Pinus lambertiana - Sugar pine
Pinus longaeva - Great Basin bristlecone pine
Pinus monophylla - Single-leaf pinyon
Pinus monticola - Western white pine
Pinus muricata - Bishop pine
Pinus ponderosa (syn. P. washoensis) - Ponderosa pine
Pinus radiata - Monterey pine, radiata pine
Pinus remota - Texas pinyon, papershell pinyon
Pinus sabineana - Gray pine, foothill pine, digger pine
Pinus strobiformis - Southwestern white pine
Pinus torreyana - Torrey pine

Southwestern United States, Mexico, Central America and Caribbean
Pinus arizonica - Arizona pine
Pinus ayacahuite - Mexican white pine
Pinus caribaea - Caribbean pine
Pinus cembroides - Mexican pinyon
Pinus chiapensis - Chiapas white pine
Pinus cooperi - Cooper's pine
Pinus cubensis - Cuban pine
Pinus culminicola - Potosi pinyon
Pinus devoniana (syn. P. michoacana) - Michoacan pine
Pinus durangensis - Durango pine
Pinus engelmannii - Apache pine
Pinus douglasiana - Douglas pine
Pinus greggii - Gregg's pine
Pinus hartwegii - Hartweg's pine
Pinus herrerae - Herrera's pine
Pinus jaliscana - Jalisco pine
Pinus johannis - Johann's pinyon
Pinus lawsonii - Lawson's pine
Pinus leiophylla - Chihuahua pine
Pinus lumholtzii - Lumholtz's pine
Pinus luzmariae
Pinus maximartinezii - Big-cone pinyon
Pinus maximinoi (syn. P. tenuifolia) - Thinleaf pine
Pinus montezumae - Montezuma pine
Pinus nelsonii - Nelson's pinyon
Pinus occidentalis - Hispaniolan pine
Pinus oocarpa - Egg-cone pine
Pinus patula - Patula pine
Pinus orizabensis - Orizaba pinyon
Pinus pinceana - Weeping pinyon
Pinus praetermissa - McVaugh's pine
Pinus pringlei - Pringle's pine
Pinus pseudostrobus - Smooth-bark Mexican pine
Pinus quadrifolia - Parry pinyon
Pinus rzedowskii - Rzedowski's pine
Pinus strobiformis - Chihuahua white pine
Pinus tecunumanii - Tecun Uman pine
Pinus teocote - Teocote pine
Pinus tropicalis - Tropical pine

South America
Pinus elliottii - Slash pine
Pinus patula - Patula pine
Pinus pinaster - Maritime pine
Pinus radiata - Radiata pine

External links

Region
Pinus, Region
Pinus, Region